The Daily Courier is a local newspaper in Kelowna, British Columbia, Canada.

The newspaper covers a wide range of topics, including local news, sports, business, entertainment, and community events. It has a print circulation of around 13,000 copies per day and also has an online edition, which is updated regularly with breaking news and other content.

See also
List of newspapers in Canada

References

External links
Daily Courier – Official website

Conservative media in Canada
Continental Newspapers
Mass media in Kelowna
Daily newspapers published in British Columbia
Publications with year of establishment missing